Rogachev is a rural locality (a khutor) in Cherkesovskoye Rural Settlement, Novoanninsky District, Volgograd Oblast, Russia. The population was 92 as of 2010.

Geography 
Rogachev is located in forest steppe on the Khopyorsko-Buzulukskaya Plain, on the bank of the Panika River, 36 km northwest of Novoanninsky (the district's administrative centre) by road. Amochayevsky is the nearest rural locality.

References 

Rural localities in Novoanninsky District